James Winston is an American former Negro league pitcher who played in the 1930s.

Winston played for the Detroit Stars and the Chicago American Giants in 1931. The following season, he played for the Atlanta Black Crackers.

References

External links
 and Seamheads

Year of birth missing
Place of birth missing
Atlanta Black Crackers players
Chicago American Giants players
Detroit Stars players
Baseball pitchers